Committee on Rules or Rules Committee

 Committee on Rules, Privileges, and Discipline, one of the ten permanent committees of the Pan-African Parliament
 United States House Committee on Rules
 United States Senate Committee on Rules, 1874–1947
 United States Senate Committee on Rules and Administration, 1947–present
 Canadian Senate Standing Committee on Rules, Procedures and the Rights of Parliament